Gold Medal Park is a  park in the Downtown East neighborhood of Minneapolis, Minnesota, United States. Opened in May 2007, the park was designed by landscape architect Tom Oslund and is owned by the city of Minneapolis. It takes its inspiration from the Native American mounds that are found throughout Minnesota, and its name from Gold Medal flour, a product of General Mills. It consists of a  mound, reached by a spiral walkway rising out of a green lawn with 300 trees. The park, just east of the Guthrie Theater, provides the Mill District neighborhood with some rare green space.

Built on a strip of land next to the Guthrie Theater and the Mississippi River, the park features specially designed luminescent benches, a prominent  mound and mature trees brought in from as far away as New Jersey.

The William W. and Nadine M. McGuire Family Foundation leased the land for 10 years, starting in 2007, from the city of Minneapolis and the Guthrie, each of which owns about half of the property. In 2014, the Gold Medal Park Conservancy purchased the majority of the parkland owned by the Guthrie, then secured a 50-year lease for the rest of the land, owned by the City of Minneapolis.

Across the street from the park and adjacent to the river is Remembrance Garden, which is a tribute to the victims of the I-35W Mississippi River bridge collapse. It was dedicated on August 1, 2011, the fourth anniversary of the collapse.

References 

2007 establishments in Minnesota
Mississippi National River and Recreation Area
Parks in Minneapolis
Protected areas on the Mississippi River